Coleophora sibiricella is a moth of the family Coleophoridae first described by Mark I. Falkovitsh in 1972. It is found in Finland, Sweden, north-western Russia and Siberia.

Adults are on wing in June and July.

The larvae feed on Larix species. They have a winter diapause.

References

sibiricella
Moths of Europe
Moths of Asia
Moths described in 1972